Kurt Lovett (born 15 January 1997) is a field hockey player from Australia, who plays as a midfielder.

Personal life
Kurt Lovett was born and raised in Parkes, New South Wales.

He is a current scholarship holder with the New South Wales Institute of Sport (NSWIS).

Career

Domestic leagues

Australian Hockey League
In 2016, Lovett made his debut for the NSW Waratahs in the Australian Hockey League. His AHL career spanned three seasons, culminating in 2018 with a silver medal.

Hockey One
Following Hockey Australia's overhaul of the AHL and subsequent introduction of the Sultana Bran Hockey One League in 2019, Kurt Lovett was named in the NSW Pride squad for the inaugural season. The team eventually won the tournament, giving Lovett his first senior national title.

National teams

Under–21
Kurt Lovett made his debut for the Australia Under–21 side in 2015, at the Sultan of Johor Cup.

He followed this up with two appearances in 2016, again at the Sultan of Johor Cup, winning a gold medal, and at the Junior World Cup.

Kookaburras
In November 2019, Lovett was named in the Kookaburras team for the first time, following two years in the National Development Squad.

References

External links
 
 
 

1997 births
Living people
Australian male field hockey players
Male field hockey midfielders
People from the Central West (New South Wales)
Sportsmen from New South Wales